Uriah Tracy (February 2, 1755July 19, 1807) was an American lawyer and politician from Connecticut. He served in the US House of Representatives (1793 to 1796) and the US Senate (1796 to 1807). From May to November 1800, Tracy served as President pro tempore of the United States Senate.

Early life and career
Tracy was born in Franklin in the Connecticut Colony. In his youth, he received a liberal education. His name is listed among those in a company from Roxbury that responded to the Lexington Alarm at the beginning of the American Revolutionary War. He later served in the Roxbury Company as a clerk

In 1778, Tracy graduated from Yale University, his contemporaries including Noah Webster. He was admitted to the bar in 1781 and then practiced law in Litchfield for many years.

Political career
He served in the state legislature in 1788 to 1793 and in the US House of Representatives from April 8, 1793 to October 13, 1796 after he had been chosen as a Federalist.

He resigned his seat when he was elected to the US Senate in place of Jonathan Trumbull Jr., who had resigned. Tracy served until the time of his death in Washington, DC on July 19, 1807.

He has the distinction of being the first member of Congress to be interred in the Congressional Cemetery. His descendants include the mathematician Curtis Tracy McMullen and the author Jeanie Gould.

In 1803, he and several other New England politicians proposed secession of New England from the union because of the growing influence of
Jeffersonian Democrats that had been helped by the Louisiana Purchase, which they felt further diminished Northern influence.

Legacy
His portrait, painted by Ralph Earl, is in the collection of the Litchfield Historical Society in Litchfield, Connecticut.

See also
List of United States Congress members who died in office (1790–1899)

References

External links

 Portrait at the Litchfield Historical Society
 
 The Political Graveyard
 Govtrack.us

Presidents pro tempore of the United States Senate
United States senators from Connecticut
Burials at the Congressional Cemetery
Yale University alumni
Litchfield Law School alumni
1755 births
1807 deaths
Connecticut Land Company
Federalist Party United States senators
Speakers of the Connecticut House of Representatives
Federalist Party members of the United States House of Representatives from Connecticut
Military personnel from Connecticut
People from Franklin, Connecticut